Tricolia munieri is a species of small sea snail with calcareous opercula, a marine gastropod mollusk in the family Phasianellidae, the pheasant snails.

Distribution
This marine species occurs off Amsterdam Island.

References

External links
 To World Register of Marine Species
 Vélain C. (1877). Observations générales sur la faune des deux iles [Saint-Paul et Amsterdam suivies d´une description des mollusques. Archives de Zoologie Expérimentale et Générale. 6: 1-144, pls 1-5]
  Lamy, E. (1931). Voyage de M. P. Lesne dans l'Afrique du Sud, 1928-1929. Mollusques marins. Bulletin du Muséum National d'Histoire Naturelle. ser. 2, 3: 304-307.

Phasianellidae
Gastropods described in 1877